International Pictures was an American film production company that existed in the 1940s. It merged with Universal Pictures to become Universal-International on October 1, 1946.

History

The company was formed in 1944. It was headed up by Leo Spitz, an executive at RKO, and William Goetz, vice president in charge for production 20th Century Fox.

In October 1943, Goetz announced International would start off making four films with an overall budget of $4.2 million, the films including Belle of the Yukon, The Woman in the Window and Casanova Brown.

In January 1944, International signed an agreement with RKO Pictures to provide four films for distribution.

Following the merger, Spitz and Goetz became head of production at Universal-International.

United Artists purchased the film library after the merger with Universal.

Select filmography
Casanova Brown (1944) – distributed by RKO
The Woman in the Window (1944) – distributed by RKO
Belle of the Yukon (1944) – distributed by RKO
It's a Pleasure (1945) – distributed by RKO
Along Came Jones (1945) – distributed by RKO
Tomorrow Is Forever (1946) – distributed by RKO
The Stranger (1946) – distributed by RKO
The Dark Mirror (1946) – distributed by Universal
Temptation (1946) – distributed by Universal

References

External links
International Pictures at IMDb
International Pictures at Cobbles

Film production companies of the United States